The following is a list of the annual selection by College Sports Communicators (CSC), known before the 2022–23 season as the College Sports Information Directors of America (CoSIDA), and its Academic All-America sponsor of the individual athlete selected as the most outstanding of the annual Men's Basketball Academic All-America selections.  Between 1996 and 2011, one winner each was chosen from both the College and University Divisions for all twelve Academic All-America teams including football.  The Academic All-America program recognizes combined athletic and academic excellence of the nation's top student-athletes.  The University Division team included eligible participants from National Collegiate Athletic Association (NCAA) Division I member schools, while the College Division team included scholar-athletes from all of the following: NCAA Division II, NCAA Division III, National Association of Intercollegiate Athletics (NAIA), Canadian universities and colleges and two-year schools.

Beginning in 2012, CSC revamped its award structure. The University Division was renamed "Division I". Since then, NCAA Divisions II and III have had their own separate All-Americans. The College Division consisted only of non-NCAA institutions through the 2017–18 school year, after which it was effectively replaced by an NAIA division restricted to members of that governing body.

Currently, each team selects Academic All-District honorees in eight geographic districts across the United States and Canada.  First team All-District honorees make the All-America team ballots. Currently, all twelve Academic All-American teams (men's and women's basketball, men's and women's soccer, men's and women's track & field, men's baseball, women's softball, men's American football, women's volleyball and men's and women's at-large teams) have four Academic All-Americans of the Year, one from each division.  In each of the four divisions (NAIA, Division I, Division II, and Division III), one of the twelve sport-by-sport Academic All-Americans of the Year is selected as the Academic All-America Team Member of the Year for that division. The most recent men's basketball players to receive the all-sports honor are Cooper Cook of Nebraska Wesleyan University and Kyle Steigenga of Cornerstone University, respectively named in Division III and the former College Division in 2018.

University Division/Division I
Note: All winners are American unless indicated otherwise.  Names in bold were winners of the all-sports Academic All-America Award.

Division II

Division III

College Division/NAIA

See also
List of Academic All-America Team Members of the Year

Footnotes

References

External links
Academic All-America information page

Awards established in 1988
College basketball trophies and awards in the United States
Men's Basketball